"Build a better mousetrap, and the world will beat a path to your door" is a phrase attributed to Ralph Waldo Emerson in the late nineteenth century. It is unknown who wrote the phrase as it was popularized. The phrase is a metaphor about the power of innovation.

Origin

The phrase is actually a misquotation of Ralph Waldo Emerson 1855 writing:

According to some sources, the current phrasing of the quotation didn't appear until 7 years after Emerson died.  Thus, in 1889, Emerson was credited with having said
 rather than 

It is unclear who deserves credit for the phrasing in common use today.

Meaning
The phrase has turned into a metaphor about the power of innovation and is frequently taken literally, with more than 4,400 patents issued by the United States Patent and Trademark Office for new mousetraps, with thousands more unsuccessful applicants, making them the "most frequently invented device in U.S. history".  The popular modern snap-trap version of the mousetrap was invented in Lititz, Pennsylvania, by John Mast in 1899, several years after the Emerson misquote had become popular.

Notes

References
 American Heritage Magazine, "A Better Mousetrap", 1996, Volume 47, Issue 6.

Innovation
Quotations from literature
Ralph Waldo Emerson
1880s neologisms